Ennai Paar is a 1961 Indian Tamil-language film directed by G. R. Nathan. The film stars T. R. Mahalingam and B. S. Saroja. It was released on 16 June 1961.

Plot

Cast 
The following list was adapted from the book Thiraikalanjiyam Part-2.

Male cast
T. R. Mahalingam
M. N. Nambiar
V. R. Rajagopal
T. Balasubramaniam
Kaka Radhakrishnan

Female cast
B. S. Saroja
Pandari Bai
L. Vijayalakshmi
G. Sakunthala
C. K. Saraswathi
T. D. Kusalakumari

Production 
The film was produced by Cr. PL. Chidambaram and B. Arokiasamy under the banner Pazhaniyappa Productions and was directed by G. R. Nathan. S. Aiya Pillai and Thamizh Pithan wrote the dialogues.

Soundtrack 
Music was composed by T. G. Lingappa and the lyrics were penned by Kannadasan, A. Maruthakasi, Ku. Ma. Balasubramaniam, S. Aiya Pillai and Thamizh Pithan.

Reception 
Kanthan of Kalki negatively reviewed the film and said, despite its title, was unwatchable.

References

External links 
 

1960s Tamil-language films
1961 films
Films scored by T. G. Lingappa